Pyotr Ustinovich Brovka (Putilkovichi24 March 1980, Minsk) was a Soviet Belarusian poet, more commonly recognized by his literary pseudonym Petrus Brovka (also transliterated from Belarusian as Piatrus Brovka or Pjatrus Broǔka).

Biography
Brovka was born into a large and poor peasant family in Putilkovichi, a settlement in present-day Ushachy Raion,  Vitebsk Region, on June 25, 1905. His first published works were printed in 1926, and the young poet briefly served as executive secretary of a local newspaper in 1927. In 1928 he enrolled in the Literature-Linguistics Department of Belarusian State University, graduating in 1931. Brovka joined the Communist Party of the Soviet Union in 1940.

During the Second World War, Brovka's mother was among the Belarusian people sent to Auschwitz by the occupying Nazi forces. Brovka himself wrote for the partisan press and published in the army newspapers, lauding the fighting effort of the Soviet people. He was recognized by the Soviet government with the Stalin Prize in 1947, the same year that Brovka was elected chairman of the Writers' Union of the Byelorussian SSR (a position that he would hold until 1967).

Brovka reputation as a Soviet and Belarusian poet continued to grow during Brovka's subsequent decades in Minsk after the war. The fullest apex of his literary talents is considered to be his final decades in the 1960s and 1970s.

Brovka was awarded the prestigious Lenin Prize after his completion of the poetry volume And Time Goes On in 1962. In 1966, Brovka edited the first volume of the Byelorussian Soviet Encyclopedia, the year he was given the title of People's Poet of the Byelorussian Soviet Socialist Republic. He was elected a full member of the Belarusian Academy of Sciences in 1966.

Apart from literary work, he served several terms as a representative of the Supreme Soviet of the Soviet Union, but maintained his literary career even as a political delegate. Some of his later verses made their way into Soviet pop music when they were adapted by the Belarusian Soviet folk rock band Pesniary.

Brovka was awarded the title Hero of Socialist Labor in 1972.

Minsk's Literary Museum of Petrus Brovka was established in his honor in 1980, when Brovka died at age 74.

In 2005, Belarus issued a postage stamp celebrating the hundredth anniversary of Pyotr Brovka's birth.

Honours and awards

 Hero of Socialist Labour (1972)
 Order of Lenin (1949, 1965, 1972)
 Order of the October Revolution (1971)
 Order of the Red Star (1943)
 Order of Friendship of Peoples (1975)
 Order of the Badge of Honour (1939)
 Lenin Prize (1962) - a collection of poems "And the days go by ..." (1961)
 Stalin Prizes;
2nd class (1947) - for the poem "Bread" and "Thoughts about Moscow", the poem "The People's thanks", "Brother and Sister", "If I be", "Meeting"
3rd class (1951) - a collection of poems "The Road of Life"
 BSSR State Prizes;
1970 - a collection of poems, "Among the red mountain ashes"
1976 - for participation in the creation of the Belarusian Soviet Encyclopedia
 Yakub Kolas Literary prize (1957) - for the novel "When the merge of the river" (1957)
 People's Poet of the Byelorussian SSR (1966)

References

1905 births
1980 deaths
People from Ushachy District
People from Borisovsky Uyezd
Communist Party of the Soviet Union members
Fourth convocation members of the Supreme Soviet of the Soviet Union
Fifth convocation members of the Supreme Soviet of the Soviet Union
Sixth convocation members of the Supreme Soviet of the Soviet Union
Seventh convocation members of the Supreme Soviet of the Soviet Union
Eighth convocation members of the Supreme Soviet of the Soviet Union
Ninth convocation members of the Supreme Soviet of the Soviet Union
Tenth convocation members of the Supreme Soviet of the Soviet Union
Members of the Central Committee of the Communist Party of Byelorussia
Members of the Supreme Soviet of the Byelorussian Soviet Socialist Republic
20th-century Belarusian poets
Soviet poets
Soviet male writers
20th-century male writers
Belarusian male poets
Belarusian State University alumni
Academicians of the Byelorussian SSR Academy of Sciences
Heroes of Socialist Labour
Lenin Prize winners
Stalin Prize winners
Recipients of the Byelorussian SSR State Prize
Recipients of the Order of Lenin
Recipients of the Order of Friendship of Peoples